In a  religious context, transfiguration, from Latin transfiguratio, is the experience of momentary divine radiance. It can function as a form of apotheosis.

In the Judeo-Christian scriptures and tradition

Jesus

Jacob
In the Ladder of Jacob, at the conclusion of this instruction, instead of simply being given the new name Israel, Jacob is introduced to his heavenly counterpart, the angel Israel.

Enoch
In the Book of Enoch, when Enoch returns to Earth, he tells his children that although they see him as the earthly, human Enoch, there is likewise an angelic Enoch (Metatron) that has stood in the Lord's Presence.

Elijah

In the departure of Elijah to heaven by chariot of fire, and horses of fire and lifted up by a whirlwind to heaven.

Moses
The apocryphal Assumption of Moses offers a detailed account of the assumption and transfiguration of Moses.

Mary
Lumen gentium states that "the Immaculate Virgin [...] was exalted by the Lord as Queen of the universe, that she might be the more fully confirmed to her Son, the Lord of lords and the conqueror of sin and death".

Transfiguration of humanity as a whole
In Christian eschatology, eternal life is said to be the transfiguration of all of humanity.

In other religions and spiritual traditions

Hinduism
Ramalinga Swamigal (1823 – 1874) is said to have obtained 'an alchemized Light body'.

Buddhism
The Buddha is said to have been twice transfigured, at the moment of his enlightenment and at the moment of his death.

Gurdjieff's Fourth Way
P. D. Ouspensky recounts an episode where he claims that he and other onlookers experienced a change in the aspect of Gurdjieff while seated in a railway carriage.

Transfiguration of demons
In demonology, some high-ranking demons, such as Lucifer, are said to have been able to shapeshift in order to deceive people.

References

Religious terminology